Ho Man Tin Estate is a public housing estate in Quarry Hill, Kowloon City District, Kowloon, Hong Kong. It consists of 9 residential blocks and a shopping arcade, including 8 blocks and the shopping arcade of Ho Man Tin (South) Estate.

Kwun Fai Court is a Home Ownership Scheme court in Quarry Hill, next to Ho Man Tin Estate. It consists of 2 blocks built in 1999. The blocks were originally the rental housing of Ho Man Tin Estate, but they were converted to HOS housing finally and sold to the residents affected by the clearance of Valley Road Estate, Ho Man Tin Estate and Hung Hom Estate privately. 

Kwun Hei Court is a Home Ownership Scheme court in Quarry Hill, next to Ho Man Tin Estate. It has 1 block built in 2000.

Kwun Tak Court is a Home Ownership Scheme court in Sheung Tak Street, Ho Man Tin. It comprises 3 blocks with totally 603 flats in two sizes - 445 to 483 square feet and 562 to 568 square feet sold at an average price of HK$8,551 per square foot. It was completed in 2019.

Background
Old Ho Man Tin Estate was located at the north of Quarry Hill, which had a total of 8 blocks completed in 1972, but it started redevelopment in the 2000s (decade). In 1997, a rest garden in the estate was reconstructed to a public housing building, King Man House. In 2000, another 8 buildings and a shopping arcade were built in Quarry Hill, the south of Old Ho Man Tin Estate, and named as Ho Man Tin (South) Estate.

Houses

Ho Man Tin Estate

Kwun Fai Court

Kwun Hei Court

Kwun Tak Court

Education
Ho Man Tin Estate, including Kwun Hei Court, is in Primary One Admission (POA) School Net 34. Within the school net are multiple aided schools (operated independently but funded with government money) and two government schools: Farm Road Government Primary School and Ma Tau Chung Government Primary School.

References

Public housing estates in Hong Kong
Residential buildings completed in 1972
Residential buildings completed in 1999
Residential buildings completed in 2000
1999 establishments in Hong Kong